Mymensingh Zilla School, also known as MZS, is a boys' public secondary school.The school was established on 3 November, 1853 as Hardinge School
during British Raj.It has its own century old reputation for providing quality education and producing ardent scholars.

The school was started as an English medium back in 1846. At present, it's a Bangla medium school and the medium of instruction is Bengali. Since 1991 the school has been running two shifts, Morning and Day. The Morning shift starts at 7:30 am and ends at 12:00 pm. The Day shift starts at 12:30 pm and ends at 5:30 pm. The school has two nearby campuses: one is meant for academic and administrative buildings while the other is for school hostel.

History

In 1846 it started as an English medium school called 'Hardinge School' at Mr. F. B. Camp's, the then Deputy Collector of the East India Company. On 3 November 1853 it started as a full-fledged English medium school near Kachari (present Laboratory School). However, it is no longer an English medium one; it follows the national curriculum of Bangladesh and the medium of instruction is Bengali. Bhagawan Chandra Bose, father of scientist Jagadish Chandra Bose, was the first headmaster of the school.

It was called multilateral pilot school during the time of first Deputy Commissioner of Mymensingh, S.M.A Kajmi, by the government. The main and present school structures were built in 1912. In 1965 the school compound was designed and reformed by an American science teacher, Mr. Dril.

The school had been used as a base of the British Army during World War II. It was also used as a training camp for freedom fighters during Bangladesh Liberation War in 1971. And more than 40 students sacrificed their lives, that time, fighting against the Pakistan Army.

On 3 March 1981, police fired tear-gas to subdue rioting Mymensingh Zilla School students. Sixty people were injured in the clash, which began when the students attempted to reoccupy part of their school hostel building that the government had recently given over to an adjacent primary training institute.

Admission
Mymensingh Zilla School has a highly selective and the most competitive enrollment system in greater Mymensingh region, now Mymensingh division.

Usually, aspirants of 2nd and 5th grade apply by December to write the admission test. Only the qualified aspirants get opportunity to be admitted to 3rd and 6th grade respectively.

Academics
The school provides education from the third through the tenth grades. Upon successful completion of the eighth grade, students have to choose to be in either the Science or Business Studies stream. However, joining science stream is contingent upon marks obtained in mathematics and general science in Junior School Certificate examination. Since the ninth grade the whole student body, thus, gets separated into two groups: Science and Business Studies. Upon successful completion of the tenth grade the students are allowed to sit for the Secondary School Certificate (SSC) examination.

Required courses for SSC examinees

Language
 Bengali (paper I and II)
 English (paper I and II)

Mathematics
 Mathematics (compulsory)

Science courses (one is optional from the last two)
 Physics
 Chemistry
 Higher mathematics
 Biology

Business studies courses
 Accounting
 Principles of business
 Business entrepreneurship

Others (compulsory)
 Bangladesh and Global Studies
 Religion (Islam or Hinduism or Buddhism or Christianity)
 Physical Education, Health and Sports

Facilities

Security and monitoring
The school campus is under the surveillance of total CCTV camera monitoring and the authority uses Biometric Attendance System to record the attendance information of its students and employees. Parents are regularly informed with the attendance information of their descendants by SMS.

Laboratories
The school provides facilities like science laboratories, projector rooms, workshop, computer lab, covered gymnasium and library. Practical lessons on physics, chemistry, and biology are normally imparted in the science laboratories.

School hostel
The school offers a hostel for the students who come from outside the city. The playground in front of the hostel is quite large and there is also a pond alongside the playground.

Auditorium
There is a spacious and century old auditorium used for cultural events. It's also known as the "Hall Room".

Library
There is a library for the students and teachers.

School uniform
The school uniform was introduced in 1968.
 Full-sleeve (optional) white shirt
 Brown (khaki) color pants
 White socks and shoes
 Navy blue sweater in winter

Co-curricular activities

Sports
Students regularly participate in different sporting events and games at different levels—local, regional, national—for which prior training and coaching are offered. Popular outdoor games include football, handball, basketball, volleyball, cricket, hockey etc. In addition to this, facilities for different indoor games like chess, table tennis, carrom, etc. are also provided.

Mymensingh Zilla School went to the 12th Nirman School Cricket Tournament finals in 1994 against Narayangonj High School. MZS lost by five wickets.

Bangladesh National Cadet Corps (BNCC)
The school has a strong BNCC team which is for all students. All students can join the BNCC. It gives the school good security at all time.

Cultural activities
Every year the school arranges many cultural programs. There are observed Annual Cultural Program, Annual Milad-Mahfil, Freshers' Reception Program and many more programs in the school. The RAG Day is a celebration ceremony for the students who are going to be graduated from the school.  The school observes some national days also. Singing, Painting, Recitation, Acting, etc. are most favourite among the students. These are some groups also for cultural activities like:
 MZS Debating Club
 Recitation Club
 Mymensingh Zilla School English Club (MZSEC)
 Mymensingh Zilla School Coding Club

Olympiads
Students effectively participate on olympiads and other science affiliated competitions and some of the students of the school have represented Bangladesh in international platform. Many talented international participants from this school represented their country in the world stage. Shanjid Anwar, Adib Hasan, Fahim Ferdous consistently gained Silver and multiple bronze medals in International Mathematical Olympiad. Many of them are now studying in the top universities of the world including Massachusetts Institute of Technology, Harvard University, University of California and so on. These achievements motivates the young students to represent their school and country in the higher premises.

Notable alumni
 Syed Ishtiaq Ahmed, an attorney general of Bangladesh
 Nurul Amin, a Pakistani lawyer and statesman
 Anandamohan Bose, an Indian political leader and social reformer, a president of the Indian National Congress
 Jagadish Chandra Bose, an polymath: a physicist, biologist, botanist, archaeologist, and science fiction writer
 Abu Sayeed Chowdhury, a President of Bangladesh
 Jyotirmoy Guhathakurta, an educator and humanist, martyred during the 1971 Dhaka University massacre
 M. Anwar Hossain, an educator, scientist and the incumbent Vice-Chancellor of Jahangirnagar University
 Syed Nazrul Islam, acting President of Bangladesh during the Bangladesh Liberation War
 Abdul Monem Khan, Governor of East Pakistan from 1962 to 1969
 Mahmudullah, a cricketer
 Krishna Kumar Mitra, Indian independence activist and journalist
 M. R. Akhtar Mukul, an author, and presenter of Chorompotro, the Ultimate Mail, during the Bangladesh Liberation War
 Abu Zafar Obaidullah, a poet
 Upendrakishore Ray Chowdhury, a musician, artist, writer, and printing pioneer
 Jamilur Reza Choudhury, National Professor of Bangladesh.
 Abul Kashem Fazlul Haq, Bangladeshi writer, essayist, translator, critic, columnist

Notable headmasters
 Girish Chandra Sen, Brahmo Samaj missionary, the first person to translate the Quran into Bengali language.
 Bhagawan Chandra Bose, father of Sir Jagadish Chandra Bose, the first Headmaster of Mymensingh Zilla School.

See also
 Vidyamoyee Govt. Girls' High School
 Government Laboratory High School, Mymensingh

References

External links

 

High schools in Bangladesh
1853 establishments in India
Educational institutions established in 1853
Boys' schools in Bangladesh